Sapiens: A Brief History of Humankind ([Ḳitsur toldot ha-enoshut]) is a book by Yuval Noah Harari, first published in Hebrew in Israel in 2011 based on a series of lectures Harari taught at The Hebrew University of Jerusalem, and in English in 2014. The book, focusing on Homo sapiens, surveys the history of humankind, starting from the Stone Age and going up to the twenty-first century. The account is situated within a framework that intersects the natural sciences with the social sciences.

The book has gathered mixed reviews. While it was positively received by the general public, scholars with relevant subject matter expertise have been very critical of its scientific and historical claims.

Summary 
Harari's work situates its account of human history within a framework: he sees the natural sciences as setting the limits of possibility for human activity and sees the social sciences as shaping what happens within those bounds. The academic discipline of history is the account of cultural change.

Harari surveys the history of humankind from the Stone Age up to the 21st century, focusing on Homo sapiens. He divides the history of Sapiens into four major parts:
 The Cognitive Revolution (c. 70,000 BCE, when imagination evolved in Sapiens).
 The Agricultural Revolution (c. 10,000 BCE, the development of agriculture).
 The unification of humankind (c. 34 CE, the gradual consolidation of human political organizations towards one global empire).
 The Scientific Revolution (c. 1543 CE, the emergence of objective science).

Harari's main argument is that Sapiens came to dominate the world because it is the only animal that can cooperate flexibly in large numbers. He argues that prehistoric Sapiens were a key cause of the extinction of other human species such as the Neanderthals and numerous other megafauna. He further argues that the ability of Sapiens to cooperate in large numbers arises from its unique capacity to believe in things existing purely in the imagination, such as gods, nations, money and human rights. He argues that these beliefs give rise to discrimination – whether racial, sexual or political - and it is potentially impossible to have a completely unbiased society. Harari claims that all large-scale human cooperation systems – including religions, political structures, trade networks and legal institutions – owe their emergence to Sapiens' distinctive cognitive capacity for fiction. Accordingly, Harari regards money as a system of mutual trust and sees political and economic systems as more or less identical with religions.

Harari's key claim regarding the Agricultural Revolution is that while it promoted population growth for Sapiens and co-evolving species like wheat and cows, it made the lives of most individuals (and animals) worse than they had been when Sapiens were mostly hunter-gatherers, since their diet and daily lives became significantly less varied. Humans' violent treatment of other animals is a theme that runs throughout the book.

In discussing the unification of humankind, Harari argues that over its history, the trend for Sapiens has increasingly been towards political and economic interdependence. For centuries, the majority of humans lived in empires, and capitalist globalization is effectively producing one, global empire. Harari argues that money, empires, and universal religions are the principal drivers of this process.

Harari sees the Scientific Revolution as founded on innovation in European thought, whereby elites became willing to admit to, and hence to try to remedy, their ignorance. He sees this as one driver of early modern European imperialism and of the current convergence of human cultures. Harari also emphasizes the lack of research into the history of happiness, positing that people today are not significantly happier than in past eras. He concludes by considering how modern technology may soon end the species as we know it, as it ushers in genetic engineering, immortality, and non-organic life. Humans have, in Harari's chosen metaphor, become gods: they can create species.

Harari cites Jared Diamond's Guns, Germs, and Steel (1997) as one of the greatest inspirations for the book by showing that it was possible to "ask very big questions and answer them scientifically".

Reception

Popular reception
First published in Hebrew in 2011, the book was released in English in 2015 and has since been translated into 65 languages. It made The New York Times best-seller list, appearing for 182 weeks (as of May 2022) including 96 consecutive weeks. It won the National Library of China's Wenjin Book Award for the best book published in 2014. Writing four years after its English-language publication, Alex Preston wrote in The Guardian that Sapiens had become a "publishing phenomenon" with "wild success" symptomatic of a broader trend toward "intelligent, challenging nonfiction, often books that are several years old". Concurrently, The Guardian listed the book as among the ten "best brainy books of the decade". The Royal Society of Biologists in the UK shortlisted the book in its 2015 Book Awards. Bill Gates ranked Sapiens among his ten favorite books, and Mark Zuckerberg also recommended it. The Kirkus awarded a star to the book, noting that it is "the great debates of history aired out with satisfying vigor". The British daily The Times also gave the book a rave review, quoting that "Sapiens is the kind of book that sweeps cobwebs out of your brain" and that it is "mind-thrilling". The Sydney Morning Herald described the book as "always engaging and often provocative".

In 2015 the Israel Museum in Jerusalem created a special, temporary exhibit based on the book, using archeological and artistic displays to demonstrate the main themes found in the book. The exhibit ran from May until December 2015.

Scholarly reception
Anthropologist Christopher Robert Hallpike reviewed the book and did not find any "serious contribution to knowledge". Hallpike suggested that "...whenever his facts are broadly correct they are not new, and whenever he tries to strike out on his own he often gets things wrong, sometimes seriously". He considered it an infotainment publishing event offering a "wild intellectual ride across the landscape of history, dotted with sensational displays of speculation, and ending with blood-curdling predictions about human destiny."

Science journalist Charles C. Mann concluded in The Wall Street Journal, "There's a whiff of dorm-room bull sessions about the author's stimulating but often unsourced assertions."

Reviewing the book in The Washington Post, evolutionary anthropologist Avi Tuschman points out problems stemming from the contradiction between Harari's "freethinking scientific mind" and his "fuzzier worldview hobbled by political correctness", but nonetheless wrote that "Harari's book is important reading for serious-minded, self-reflective sapiens."

Reviewing the book in The Guardian, philosopher Galen Strawson concluded that, among several other problems, "Much of Sapiens is extremely interesting, and it is often well expressed. As one reads on, however, the attractive features of the book are overwhelmed by carelessness, exaggeration and sensationalism". He specifically mentions how the author ignores happiness studies, that his claims of the "opening of a gap between the tenets of liberal humanism and the latest findings of the life sciences" is silly and deplores how the author, once again, transforms Adam Smith into the apostle of greed.

Bibliographic details
The original Hebrew publication was first issued in 2011 as קיצור תולדות האנושות [Ḳitsur toldot ha-enoshut], which translates into A Brief History of Humankind.

A 2012 English translation was self-published with the title From Animals Into Gods. The English translation was published in 2015 as Sapiens: A Brief History of Humankind, "translated by the author with the help of John Purcell and Haim Watzman", simultaneously in London by Harvill Secker  (hardback),  (trade paperback) and in Canada by Signal ( (bound),  (html)). It was then republished in London by Vintage Books in 2015 ( (paperback)).

In 2020 the first volume of the graphic novel version of the book was published simultaneously in several languages, with the title Sapiens: A Graphic History, Volume 1: The Birth of Humankind. It is credited as coauthored by Harari and David Vandermeulen, with adaptation and illustrations by Daniel Casanave. The second volume Sapiens: A Graphic History, Volume 2: The Pillars of Civilization was published in October 2021.

See also

 Homo Deus: A Brief History of Tomorrow
 The Outline of History (H. G. Wells)
 Guns, Germs, and Steel (Jared Diamond)
 The 10,000 Year Explosion: How Civilization Accelerated Human Evolution  (Gregory Cochran and Henry Harpending)
 The Dawn of Everything (David Graeber and David Wengrow)
 Symbolic culture

References

External links
 
 Yuval Harari interviewed by Alan Philps about his book, The World Today, September 2015, Volume 71, Number 5.
 Bill Gates. How Did Humans Get Smart?, Gates Notes, May 17, 2016.
 Dirk Lindebaum. Sapiens: A brief history of humankind (Book Review), Management Learning, 46 (5) 2015, pp. 636–638. 
Sapiens: Summary in Brief

2011 non-fiction books
History books about civilization
Books by Yuval Noah Harari
Anthropology books
Non-fiction books adapted into comics
Universal history books